Speas is a surname. Notable people with the surname include:

Ben Speas (born 1991), American soccer player
Bill Speas (1887–1969), American baseball player and manager
Jan Cox Speas (1925–1971), American writer 
Nate James (born 1979), British singer-songwriter
Peggy Speas, American linguist